Amol is a city in Iran.

Amol, AMOL, etc. may also refer to:

 Amol County, an administrative subdivision of Iran
 attomole, symbol: amole, a unit of amount
 Amol language, a language of Papua New Guinea
 Acute monocytic leukemia, blood disorder
 A Memory of Light, title of the final book of The Wheel of Time by Robert Jordan
 Automated Measurement of Lineups, technology used by Nielsen Ratings to track the TV program being transmitted

People with the name 
 Amol Ratan Balwadkar, Indian social worker
 Amol Bose, Bangladeshi actor
 Amol Dighe, Indian physicist
 Amol Gole, Indian cinematographer
 Amol Jichkar, Indian cricketer
 Amol Jungade, Indian cricketer
 Amol Kolhe, Indian actor and politician
 Amol Arvindrao Kulkarni, Indian chemist
 Amol Mitkari, Indian activist and politician
 Amol Muzumdar, Indian cricketer
 Amol Palekar, Indian actor and director
 Amol Parashar, Indian actor
 Amol Rathod, Indian cinematographer
 Amol Redij, Indian writer
 Amol Sarva, American entrepreneur
 Amol Shinde, Indian cricketer
 Amol Ubarhande, Indian cricketer

See also 
 Amole (disambiguation)
 Amul (disambiguation)